Leverkusen-Küppersteg is a railway station on the Cologne–Duisburg railway, situated in Leverkusen in western Germany. It is classified by Deutsche Bahn as a category 5 station. It is served by the S6 line of the Rhine-Ruhr S-Bahn at 20-minute intervals.

References 

Railway stations in Germany opened in 1845
S6 (Rhine-Ruhr S-Bahn)
Rhine-Ruhr S-Bahn stations
Buildings and structures in Leverkusen